Christian Thielemann (born 1 April 1959) is a German conductor. He is currently chief conductor of the Staatskapelle Dresden. He was artistic director of the Salzburg Easter Festival from 2013 to 2022.

Biography and career
Born in West Berlin, Thielemann studied viola and piano there and took private lessons in composition and conducting before becoming répétiteur aged 19 at the Deutsche Oper Berlin with Heinrich Hollreiser and working as Herbert von Karajan's assistant. He worked at a number of smaller German theatres including the Musiktheater im Revier in Gelsenkirchen, in Karlsruhe, Hanover, at Düsseldorf's Deutsche Oper am Rhein as First Kapellmeister and in Nürnberg as Generalmusikdirektor before returning to the Deutsche Oper Berlin in 1991 to conduct Wagner's Lohengrin. During this time, he also assisted Daniel Barenboim at the Bayreuth Festspielhaus.

Thielemann made his US debut during the 1991–1992 season in a new production of Strauss' Elektra in San Francisco. Subsequent engagements at the Metropolitan Opera in New York followed. In 1997, he became Generalmusikdirektor of the Deutsche Oper Berlin. A report in 2000 stated that Thielemann was to leave the Deutsche Oper in 2001 over artistic conflicts with the then-incoming artistic director Udo Zimmermann. Thielemann remained with the company until 2004, when he resigned over conflicts regarding Berlin city funding between the Deutsche Oper and the Staatsoper Unter den Linden.

Thielemann became principal conductor and music director of the Munich Philharmonic in September 2004. He stepped down from his Munich post in 2011, after disputes with orchestra management over final approval of selection of guest conductors and programs for the orchestra.

In October 2009, the Sächsische Staatskapelle Dresden announced the appointment of Thielemann as its next chief conductor, effective with the 2012/13 season. His current contract with Dresden was through 2019. In November 2017, the Staatskapelle Dresden announced the extension of Thielemann's contract as chief conductor through 31 July 2024.  In 2020, Thielemann was appointed honorary professor at the Carl Maria von Weber Academy of Music in Dresden.   In May 2021, Barbara Klepsch, the Culture Minister of Saxony, announced that Thielemann is to conclude his tenure with the Staatskapelle Dresden at the close of his current contract, at the end of July 2024.

Thielemann is a regular conductor at the Bayreuth Festival, following his début in 2000 with Wagner's Die Meistersinger von Nürnberg, and at the Salzburg Festival. With the decision in September 2008 of the Richard Wagner Festival Foundation to appoint Katharina Wagner and Eva Wagner-Pasquier to succeed Wolfgang Wagner as directors of the Bayreuth Festival, Thielemann was named musical advisor. In June 2015, the Bayreuth Festival formally announced the appointment of Thielemann as its music director. This contract expired in 2020. With conducting Lohengrin in 2018, Thielemann has conducted all ten works by Richard Wagner that are regularly performed at the festival, a feat only Felix Mottl achieved before him. 

Thielemann attracted controversy after attribution of anti-semitic remarks to him in 2000, regarding Daniel Barenboim, which Thielemann subsequently denied. Other controversy has related to Thielemann's publication of opinions in sympathy with the Pegida movement.

In 2003, Thielemann was awarded the Order of Merit of the Federal Republic of Germany (Bundesverdienstkreuz). In October 2011, he received honorary membership of the Royal Academy of Music in London. In 2015, Thielemann won the Richard Wagner Award (Richard-Wagner-Preis) of Leipzig. He served in the Humanitas Programme as Visiting Professor in Opera Studies at Oxford University in January 2016. In 2019, he made his first conducting appearance in the New Year's Concert with the Vienna Philharmonic Orchestra, and is scheduled to return to conduct the 2024 Vienna New Year's Concert.

Recordings
For Sony Music
Ludwig van Beethoven, "The Symphonies", Vienna Philharmonic, 2012
Anton Bruckner, Symphony No.8, Vienna Philharmonic, 2019
Anton Bruckner, Symphony No.3, Vienna Philharmonic, 2020
Anton Bruckner, Symphony No.4, Vienna Philharmonic, 2020

For Profil
 Anton Bruckner, Symphony No. 8, Sächsische Staatskapelle Dresden, October 2010

For Opus Arte
 Richard Wagner, Der Ring des Nibelungen with Michelle Breedt, Albert Dohmen, Stephen Gould, Hans-Peter König, Linda Watson and Eva-Maria Westbroek, Bayreuth Festival orchestra, recorded live during the 2008 Festival, November 2009

For Brilliant Classics
 Arnold Schoenberg, Richard Wagner, Pelleas und Melisande and Siegfried Idyll, Orchestra of the Deutsche Oper Berlin, November 2009

For Decca
 Richard Strauss, Der Rosenkavalier DVD with Renée Fleming, Sophie Koch, Diana Damrau, Franz Hawlata and Jonas Kaufmann, Munich Philharmonic, October 2009

For Deutsche Grammophon
 Der kleine Hörsaal, Dirigieren mit Christian Thielemann, July 2007
Ludwig van Beethoven, Overture "Egmont" and Johannes Brahms, Symphony No.1, Munich Philharmonic, April 2007
Wolfgang Amadeus Mozart, Requiem, Munich Philharmonic and Choir of the Bavarian Radio Symphony Orchestra, November 2006
Richard Wagner, Parsifal, Choir and Orchestra of the Vienna State Opera, April 2006
Anton Bruckner, Symphony No.5, Munich Philharmonic, March 2005
Heinrich Marschner, Felix Mendelssohn Bartholdy, Otto Nicolai, Carl Maria von Weber, Richard Wagner, Overtures, Vienna Philharmonic, October 2004
Richard Wagner, Tristan und Isolde, Orchestra of the Vienna State Opera, May 2004
Richard Strauss, Ein Heldenleben and Symphonic Fantasy of Die Frau ohne Schatten, Vienna Philharmonic, August 2003
Albert Lortzing, Richard Strauss, Carl Maria von Weber, Richard Wagner, Deutsche Opernarien with Thomas Quasthoff and the Orchestra of the Deutsche Oper Berlin, April 2002
Robert Schumann, Symphonies No.1 and No.4, Philharmonia Orchestra, 2001
Richard Strauss, Arabella with Kiri Te Kanawa and the Orchestra and Choir of the Metropolitan Opera, March 2001
Richard Strauss, Eine Alpensinfonie and Suite of Der Rosenkavalier, Vienna Philharmonic, March 2001
Arnold Schoenberg, Pelleas und Melisande and Richard Wagner, Siegfried Idyll, June 1999
Carl Orff, Carmina Burana, Choir and Orchestra of the Deutsche Oper Berlin, May 1999
Robert Schumann, Symphony No.3 "Rheinische", Overture "Genoveva", Op. 81, Overture, Scherzo and Finale, Op. 52, Philharmonia Orchestra, 1999
Richard Wagner, Orchestra Music (Lohengrin, Parsifal, Tristan und Isolde), Philadelphia Orchestra, February 1998
Robert Schumann, Symphony No.2, Overture Manfred, Concert for 4 Horns, Op. 86, Philharmonia Orchestra, September 1997
Ludwig van Beethoven, Funeral Cantata on the Death of the Emperor Joseph II, Robert Schumann, Konzertstück, Op. 86, for 4 Horns and Orchestra, Hans Pfitzner, Palestrina (Preludes to acts 1 and 2), 1997
Hans Pfitzner, Music from Palestrina; Das Käthchen von Heilbronn; Richard Strauss, Guntram (prelude), Capriccio (prelude), Feuersnot (love scene), Orchestra of the Deutsche Oper Berlin, 1996

For EMI Classics
Richard Wagner and Richard Strauss, Arias by René Kollo, Orchestra of the Deutsche Oper Berlin, 1992

For Unitel Classica
 Richard Strauss, Arabella. Live recording of Salzburg Easter Festival 2014. DVD and Blue Ray with Renée Fleming, Thomas Hampson, Hanna-Elisabeth Müller, Daniel Behle. Stage director: Florentine Klepper, Sächsischer Staatsopernchor and Staatskapelle Dresden. Unitel Classica, September 2014.

TV and film productions

Productions about Thielemann
 Christian Thielemann, documentary film, Germany, 2012, directed by Mathias Siebert, produced by Bremedia Produktion, Radio Bremen, MDR, in the serial Deutschland, deine Künstler.
 Christian Thielemann – Romantischer Querkopf, documentary film by Felix Schmidt, 2007, produced by FTS Media and Unitel, coproduced by Classica
 Through the Night with Christoph Schlingensief and Christian Thielemann (Durch die Nacht mit ...), documentary film, Germany, 2002, directed by: Edda Baumann-von Broen and Daniel Finkernagel, produced by: avanti media, ZDF and arte.

Productions with Thielemann
 Frederick the Great Remix (Der Große Friedrich Remix – Musik um den Preußenkönig), directed by Friederike Schlumbom, Oktober 18, 2012, Rundfunk Berlin-Brandenburg
 Discovering Beethoven (Beethoven entdecken), documentary TV serial, Germany, Austria, 2011, directed by Christoph Engel and Anca-Monica Pandelea, produced by: Unitel Classica, ORF, ZDF, 3satJoachim Kaiser and Christian Thielemann talk about Beethoven's nine symphonies.

Concert records on TV
 The Vienna Philharmonic in Beijing (Die Wiener Philharmoniker in Beijing). National Centre for the Performing Arts of Beijing, recording of 3 November 2013, 3sat
 Wagner Birthday Concert: Thielemann conducts the Staatskapelle Dresden (Wagner-Geburtstagskonzert: Thielemann dirigiert die Sächsische Staatskapelle), recording of Mai 21, 2013, directed by: Michael Beyer, ZDF
 Thielemann conducts Strauß (Thielemann dirigiert Strauß), Christian Thielemann and the Vienna Philharmonic, Salzburg Festival 2011, Great Festival Hall, Salzburg, directed by Michael Beyer, 3sat
 Summer Night Music with Christian Thielemann (Sommernachtsmusik mit Christian Thielemann), Christian Thielemann conducts the Munich Philharmonic, Herrenchiemsee Palace, 31 August 2010, directed by Henning Kasten, ZDF and Arte

Awards
2003: Order of Merit of the Federal Republic of Germany (Bundesverdienstkreuz)
2011: Honorary doctorate from Hochschule für Musik Franz Liszt, Weimar
2011: Inclusion in the Royal Academy of Music, London
2012: Honorary doctorate from the KU Leuven, Belgium
2015: Richard Wagner Award (Richard-Wagner-Preis)

Publications
 
 Christian Thielemann, Mein Leben mit Wagner. Munich: Beck, 2012, 

 Christian Thielemann, Meine Reise zu Beethoven. Munich: Beck, 2020,

References

External links

 Christian Thielemann by KlassikAkzente
 Christian Thielemann Biography in cosmopolis.ch
 Interview with Christian Thielemann, 12 March 1993
 "Christian Thielemann – the power and the politics" by Tom Service, The Guardian, 15 October 2009
 "Christian Thielemann citation" by James Jolly, Royal Academy of Music, 14 October 2011
 "A Conductor's Point of View" , 21 January 2016 programme, Oxford University

1959 births
Living people
Musicians from Berlin
German male conductors (music)
21st-century German conductors (music)
Deutsche Grammophon artists
Music directors (opera)
Officers Crosses of the Order of Merit of the Federal Republic of Germany
Honorary Members of the Royal Academy of Music
20th-century German conductors (music)
Hochschule für Musik Hanns Eisler Berlin alumni
20th-century German male musicians
21st-century German male musicians